Saana Saarteinen (born 11 February 1993) is a Finnish tennis player.

Career
Saarteinen was born in Tampere. On 11 October 2010, she reached her best singles ranking of world number 1083. On 18 July 2011, she peaked at world number 929 in the doubles rankings.

Saarteinen has a 0–1 record for Finland in Fed Cup competition.

Saana Saarteinen’s great grandfather was the Finnish track and field athlete Eino Seppälä.

Fed Cup participation

Doubles

References

External links 
 
 
 

1993 births
Living people
Sportspeople from Tampere
Finnish female tennis players
University of Tulsa alumni
Tulsa Golden Hurricane women's tennis players
20th-century Finnish women
21st-century Finnish women